Freedom Advances (AL) is an Argentine centre-right to right-wing political coalition with legal status in the Buenos Aires Province.

José Luis Espert finally ran in the legislative elections with his own alliance of right-wing and center-right parties. The presentation was made after the negotiations with the leaders of Juntos por el Cambio failed.

Previously, the alliance in the Autonomous City of Buenos Aires also included Javier Milei, until he confirmed in various media that he would compete separately from José Luis Espert.

History

Frente Despertar 
On June 11, 2019, the coalition "Frente Despertar" was made official before the courts, which led to José Luis Espert, as candidate for president, and Luis Rosales, as candidate for vice president, in the 2019 presidential election. Espert had declared his intention to participate in the presidential race on December 23, 2018. This national Frente was made up of the Unite for Freedom and Dignity party, the Union of the Democratic Centre (except in the City of Buenos Aires) and some sectors of the Libertarian Party. In the beginning, the alliance had the support of Alberto Asseff, president of the UNIR Constitutional Nationalist Party; but, after a sudden change, he decided to leave the front and support Juntos por el Cambio. This fact caused that the ex alliance was almost terminated by Assef's sudden change; However, due to the signing of the UNITE seal, he was able to participate in the elections a few days later.

Espert launched his electoral campaign at the "Héctor Etchart" stadium of the Ferro Carril Oeste club, in the Buenos Aires neighborhood of Caballito, where he was accompanied by his main candidates. There he asked to vote "neither with fear nor anger" and abandon "the crack speech".

Finally, in the primary elections, the electoral front obtained 2.16% of the votes, a total of 550,593 votes. Having exceeded 1.5% of the required votes, they were able to stand in the general elections. In the October elections they obtained a total of 394,206 votes, 1.47% of the votes; being, in this way, last in front of five other candidates.

Avanza Libertad 
In September 2020, during a live broadcast with José Luis Espert; the media economist, Javier Milei, confirmed that he would be a candidate for deputy for the City of Buenos Aires, on behalf of the Frente Despertar.

On October 23, 2020, the lawyer, Francisco Oneto, also made the decision to support the space by adhering to its electoral proposals.

On March 10, 2021, a meeting was held between the main referents of the Autonomist Party, the Democratic Party, the UCEDE, United Republicans, the Republican Liberal Party, Avanza Libertad and Valores para mi País, for the formation of an electoral coalition called as "Frente Vamos" whose objective was to compete in the 2021 legislative election. However, soon after José Antonio Romero Feris, president of the Autonomist Party, announced that he would not participate in any electoral alliance that "divides the opposition political arc".

In June 2021, José Luis Espert proposed a broad opposition front against the government of Axel Kicillof in the Province of Buenos Aires for the 2021 legislative election, said front would include anti-Kirchnerist sectors such as, for example, Juntos por el Cambio. Finalmente, esta propuesta nunca se pudo concretar.

Legislative elections of 2021 
On July 14, 2021, the closing day for the presentation of alliances for the legislative elections of 2021, the Avanza Libertad coalition was made official with parties from the Argentine political center-right sector in the Province of Buenos Aires. The UCEDE, the Democratic Party and the Autonomist Party will participate in the coalition; in addition to groups that are not yet considered, legally, political parties in the province, such as United Republicans and the Republican Libertarian Movement.

Goals 
The electoral platform of Avanza Libertad has fourteen proposals; They were announced in conjunction with Espert's candidacy, and published on the coalition's website, where they are developed more broadly.

 Eliminate or reduce to a very low and uniform minimum import tariffs.
 Sign free trade agreements with all regions or countries that wish to access the local market.
 Eliminate export taxes (retentions).
 Reduce public spending.
 Focus attention on the most vulnerable sectors.
 Transform social plans into in-kind disbursements (community kitchens, health and education plans, etc.).
 Lower the tax burden, including the elimination of certain taxes and the reduction of others.
 Keep fiscal accounts balanced.
 Reduce the expenses of the political apparatus.
 End the partnership and propose a political regionalization of the provinces in order to obtain jurisdictions that are self-financing.
 Eliminate all industrial and regional promotion regimes.
 Reforms within syndicalism and collective bargaining agreements.
 Reform the educational system.
 Reform the Penal Code and Criminal Procedure of the Nation, imposing sentences of effective compliance and eliminating constitutional guarantees that favor criminals.

Controversies 
Various journalistic media and referents of Argentine economic liberalism criticized the alleged financing by Kirchnerism of the 2019 campaign of the Despertar Front for which its campaign manager, the former member of the Civic Coalition ARI Nazareno Etchepare, would have resigned. Luis Rosales forcefully denied all the accusations. In turn, an alleged collaboration by Kirchnerism in the control of the ballots during the elections came to light and so that the front could print its ballots in the province of Buenos Aires glued to its local candidates.

In August 2020, the journalist Eduardo Feinmann revived these accusations on his television program and social networks, stating that the economist's candidacy was promoted by the former president and political shipowner Eduardo Duhalde; that was financed by Wado de Pedro and mayors of the suburbs and later by the head of government Horacio Rodríguez Larreta. This last statement was confirmed by the former first candidate for Buenos Aires legislator linked to the convicted former minister Julio de Vido, Gonzalo Díaz Córdoba, who was appointed in 2020 by the Buenos Aires government as trustee of the Puerto Madero Corporation.

The economist Diego Giacomini, who accompanied José Luis Espert during the first part of his 2019 campaign, and the musician Emmanuel Danann, also confirmed the previous accusations, indicating that Espert would have been promoted by Eduardo Duhalde and Carlos Menem to subtract votes from the macrism and allow the Frente de Todos to reach the ballot.

The Despertar Front was also accused of having rented the parties presided over by Alberto Assef (UNIR) and José Bonacci (UNITE) in exchange for money.

Although the financing reports of the Frente Despertar campaign did not declare private contributions, it is also suspected that the campaign was financed by Federico "Fred" Machado, a businessman arrested for crimes of illicit association for the manufacture and distribution of cocaine, money laundering and fraud. It was also argued that the campaign received contributions from the Governor of the Province of Formosa, Gildo Insfrán, and the late banker Jorge Horacio Brito, thanks to the link between Sergio Massa and Daniel Ivoskus. Finally, it was also said that Daniel Vila, President of Grupo América, supported Espert's candidacy.

As a result of the doubts related to the financing of the presidential campaign of the Ex-Frente Despertar in 2019, and the ties with Federico "Fred" Machado, José Luis Espert was denounced along with Luis Rosales, Javier Milei, Jimena Aristizabal and Nazareno Etchepare, before the Federal Criminal and Correctional Court No. 8, for the crimes of concealment and illicit association.

Member parties

Electoral results

Presidential elections

National Deputies for the Province of Buenos Aires

Deputies of the Province of Buenos Aires

Senate of the Province of Buenos Aires

See also 

 José Luis Espert
 Javier Milei
 Union of the Democratic Centre (Argentina)
 Anarcho-capitalism

References

External links 

 Sitio web de José Luis Espert
 Sitio web oficial del Frente Despertar
 Sitio web oficial de Avanza Libertad
 www.parlamentario.com

2019 in Argentina
Political party alliances in Argentina
Political parties established in 2019